The 2021–22 Princeton Tigers Men's ice hockey season was the 119th season of play for the program and the 60th season in the ECAC Hockey conference. The Tigers represented the Princeton University and played their home games at the Hobey Baker Memorial Rink, and were coached by Ron Fogarty, in his 7th season.

Season
After losing all of their previous season to the COVID-19 pandemic, Princeton started the year well, posting a winning record through their third week. Afterwards, the team's goaltending faltered and the Tigers lost nine consecutive games, dropping them to the bottom of the conference standings.

Around Christmas, Princeton was one of several teams affected by an uptick in COVID positives that forced the team to postpone several games until later in the season. At one point, Princeton was prepared to use Rachel McQuigge, the starting goalie for the women's team, as a backup but the game in question was delayed and the idea was never put into practice. The delay did allow the team to refocus for the second half of the season and the Tigers reeled off several wins to climb up into the middle of the ECAC pack.

Senior Jérémie Forget took command of the Princeton crease by February, however, an injury knocked him out for the remainder of the regular season. Aidan Porter was installed in goal for the six games that had been shoehorned into the final two weeks and Princeton ended up losing each match. While the defense wasn't able to keep the puck out of the net, the offense had also regressed, getting shut out in three of those games.

Princeton got its starting goalie back in time for the postseason, but Forget had little time to get back into the swing of things. The Tiger's allowed Union to shell their net, allowing 37 shots against in both games. Forget held the fort in the first contest, allowing 3 goals, but the offense remained diminished and Princeton was swept out of the playoffs.

Departures

Recruiting

Roster
As of August 19, 2021.

Standings

Schedule and results

|-
!colspan=12 style=";" | Exhibition

|-
!colspan=12 style=";" | Regular Season

|-
!colspan=12 style=";" | 

|- align="center" bgcolor="#e0e0e0"
|colspan=12|Princeton Lost Series 0–2

Scoring statistics

Goaltending statistics

Rankings

Note: USCHO did not release a poll in week 24.

Players drafted into the NHL

2022 NHL Entry Draft

† incoming freshman

References

2021-22
Princeton Tigers
Princeton Tigers
Princeton Tigers
Princeton Tigers